Loricaria lundbergi is a species of catfish in the family Loricariidae. It is native to South America, where it occurs in the Rio Negro drainage basin in Brazil and Venezuela. It is typically found in blackwater habitats. An analysis of the stomach contents of a single individual found evidence of feeding on insect larvae, including those of the family Chironomidae, as well as sand and detritus. The species reaches 13.8 cm (5.4 inches) in standard length and is believed to be a facultative air-breather. Its specific epithet, lundbergi, honors John G. Lundberg of the Academy of Natural Sciences of Drexel University (formerly the Academy of Natural Sciences of Philadelphia) for his contributions to Neotropical ichthyology.

References 

Loricariidae
Fish described in 2008